Events from the year 1886 in Denmark.

Incumbents
 Monarch – Christian IX
 Prime minister – J. B. S. Estrup

Events
 
 17 August – King Luís I of Portugal is received at Amalienborg Palace during his visit to Denmark.

Undated

Sports
 17 July  Boldklubben Frem is founded.
 2+ October  Københavns Roklub is founded.

Births
 26 April – Olaf Rude, painter (died 1957)

Deaths
 12 December – Johan Nicolai Madvig, philologist and politician (born 1804)

References

 
1880s in Denmark
Denmark
Years of the 19th century in Denmark